Ambala railway station is a main railway station in Ambala district, Haryana. Its code is UBC. It serves Ambala city. The station consists of three platforms, none well sheltered. It lacks many facilities including water and sanitation. It lies on Moradabad–Ambala line and Ambala–Attari line. Around 71 trains pass through the station daily.

References

External links
 
Google Maps link

Railway stations in Ambala district
Ambala railway division
Transport in Ambala